Chenar Khoshkeh (also Romanized as Chenār Khoshkeh) is a village in Kakasharaf Rural District, in the Central District of Khorramabad County, Lorestan Province, Iran. At the 2006 census, its population was 184, in 41 families.

References 

Towns and villages in Khorramabad County

Chenar Khokhe village is considered one of the important villages of Khorramabad city - Kakashraf district.
This village is considered one of the historical villages.
The residents of this village are mainly from Segund - Papi - Sayyed - Biranvand clans.
One of the most important early residents of this village is the late Hossein Qoli Segund